German submarine U-719 was a Type VIIC U-boat of Nazi Germany's Kriegsmarine during World War II. The submarine was laid down on 3 July 1942 at the H. C. Stülcken Sohn yard at Hamburg, launched on 28 April 1943, and commissioned on 27 July 1943 under the command of Oberleutnant zur See Klaus-Dietrich Steffens. Attached to 5th U-boat Flotilla based at Kiel, U-719 completed her training period on 30 April 1944 and was assigned to front-line service.

Design
German Type VIIC submarines were preceded by the shorter Type VIIB submarines. U-719 had a displacement of  when at the surface and  while submerged. She had two shafts and two  propellers.

U-719 was fitted with five  torpedo tubes (four fitted at the bow and one at the stern), fourteen torpedoes, one  SK C/35 naval gun, 220 rounds, and two twin  C/30 anti-aircraft guns. The boat had a complement of between forty-four and sixty.

Service history
On the first and only war patrol, U-719 was picked up by HMS Bulldog's ASDIC on 26 June 1944 northwest of Ireland. Bulldog attacked the U-boat with hedgehogs, destroying U-719 in the third attempt. All 52 crew members perished in the event.

References

Bibliography

External links

World War II submarines of Germany
German Type VIIC submarines
1942 ships
Ships built in Hamburg
U-boats commissioned in 1942
U-boats sunk in 1943
U-boats sunk by British aircraft
U-boats sunk by depth charges
World War II shipwrecks in the Atlantic Ocean
Maritime incidents in June 1944